Ross McCann (born 30 October 1997) is a Scottish rugby player who plays as a winger.

From a sporting family, he and his brothers Ali McCann, who is a footballer who plays for Preston North End F.C., and Lewis McCann who plays for Dunfermline F.C., are all from Edinburgh, born to an English mother and a Northern Irish father.

Ross McCann went to school in Cramond and then the Royal High School, Edinburgh and was a school friend of Charlie Shiel with whom he also played for the Royal High Corstorphine RFC and represented the under-20s for Scotland together. McCann went on then to play for Stewart's Melville RFC and Melrose RFC. He signed a full-time contract to play in Scotland's sevens squad in 2018.

In March 2021 he was named in the Great Britain Rugby Sevens training squad ahead of the 2020 Summer Games. On 18 June 2021 McCann was confirmed in the official Britain squad to travel to Tokyo.

References

1997 births
Living people
Scottish rugby sevens players
Rugby sevens players at the 2020 Summer Olympics
Olympic rugby sevens players of Great Britain
Rugby sevens players at the 2022 Commonwealth Games